Yi Ja-gyeom (died 19 January 1127) of the Incheon Yi clan, was a Korean politician, soldier, regent, and poet in the middle Goryeo dynasty. In 1122, he became the Duke Hanyang (한양공, 漢陽公) and the Duke of Joseon State (조선국공, 朝鮮國公) two years later. As the full maternal grandfather of Injong of Goryeo, Yi became the young king's regent after his father's death and even purged those who were trying to usurp the throne. He gained more power upon marrying his two daughters to Injong, but was eventually eliminated by Injong after he tried to poison the king.

In 1126, he started a rebellion to purged his opponents and seized his own power, but was removed by Cheok Jun-gyeong (척준경), Yi's previous ally but whom now sided with Injong. During his exile in Jeollanam-do, Yi ate a dried fish and named it "Yeonggwang Gulbi" (영광 굴비) after "Yeonggwang" was his exile location and "Gulbi" was came from one of his word, "I Won't Give Up" (뜻을 굽히지 않겠다). Although exiled peoples are mostly forgotten by the monarch, Injong still respected Yi as his maternal grandfather and his guardian when he was too young, thus he gave Yi and his wife, Lady Choe some tributes from the palace and deeply commemorated them, even gave all of their sons "600 grains" (600석 곡식) each.

Family
Father: Yi Ho (이호)
Grandfather: Yi Ja-yeon (이자연)
Grandmother: Grand Lady of Gyerim State, of the Gyeongju Gim clan (계림국대부인 경주 김씨) – daughter of Gim In-wi (김인위).
Mother: Grand Lady of Tongui State of the Gwangsan Gim clan (통의국대부인 광산 김씨) – daughter of Gim Jeong-jun (김정준).
Older sister: Princess Janggyeong (장경궁주) – married Sunjong of Goryeo.
Younger brother: Yi Ja-ryang (이자량)
Younger brother: Yi Ja-ham (이자함)
Younger brother: Yi Ja-won (이자원)
Younger sister: Lady Yi – married Gim In-jon (김인존) from the Gangneung Gim clan.
Wife: Grand Lady of Byeonhan State, of the Haeju Choe clan (변한국대부인 최씨) – 2nd daughter of Choe Sa-chu (최사추).
Yi Ji-mi (이지미); 1st son
Yi Gong-ui (이공의); 2nd son
Yi Ji-eon (이지언); 3rd son
Yi Ji-bo (이지보); 4th son
Yi Ji-yun (이지윤); 5th son
Yi Ji-won (이지원); 6th son – married a daughter of Cheok Jun-gyeong (척준경) from the Goksan Cheok clan.
Lady Yi; 1st daughter – married Bak Hyo-ryeom (박효렴).
Queen Sundeok; 2nd daughter – wife of Yejong of Goryeo and mother of Injong of Goryeo.
Deposed Princess Yeondeok; 3rd daughter – first wife of Injong of Goryeo.
Deposed Princess Bokchang; 4th daughter – second wife of Injong of Goryeo.

References

Site web
 Lee Ja-kyum 
 Lee Ja-kyum 
 https://web.archive.org/web/20160304050940/http://mtcha.com.ne.kr/korea-term/goryo/term113-ijagyum%20nan.htm

Korean politicians
Korean military personnel
1126 deaths
Year of birth unknown
Incheon Lee clan
12th-century Korean poets